Frinolli is an Italian surname. Notable people with the surname include:

Giorgio Frinolli (born 1970), Italian sprint runner
Roberto Frinolli (born 1940), Italian sprint runner, father of Giorgio

Italian-language surnames